Flower Drum Song is a 1958 Rodgers & Hammerstein stage musical based on C. Y. Lee novel.

Flower Drum Song may also refer to:

 "Flower Drum Song" (album), a 1959 album by The Mastersounds of jazz interpretations of the songs from the stage musical
 Flower Drum Song (film), a 1961 musical film based on the stage musical
 The Flower Drum Song (novel), a 1957 novel by C. Y. Lee, adapted into the musical
 Flower Drum Song (song) (Fengyang Flower Drum), a Chinese folk song
 Flower-drum opera, or Huaguxi, a form of Chinese opera

See also
 Flower drum